Ayn Halaqim Subdistrict  is a Syrian nahiyah (subdistrict) located in Masyaf District in Hama.  According to the Syria Central Bureau of Statistics (CBS), Ayn Halaqim Subdistrict had a population of 16502 in the 2004 census.

References 

Ayn Halaqim
Masyaf District